China plays an increasing important role of economic and developmental importance in the region and the relations with China have increased steadily over time. The Caribbean's relations with China, are largely defined as either: the People's Republic of China (PRC; "China") or the Republic of China (ROC; "Taiwan").
Historically, relations were mostly based upon trade, credits, and light investments, which have increased significantly since the 1990s. For many Caribbean nations, the increasing ties with China have been used as a way to decrease long time over-dependence on western developed nations, and as a move towards South-South cooperation alongside deepening of relations with neighbouring Latin America and Africa.

The Overseas Chinese population, in this case Chinese Caribbeans, have been resident in the Caribbean region for centuries and have helped to make importaint contributions with cultural, trade, and political links in the region. For example Sir Solomon Hochoy of Trinidad and Tobago and Arthur Chung, of Guyana were among the first of ethnic Chinese ancestry to lead countries in the Americas.  In more modern times China and Taiwan have also expanded several levels of cooperation with the Caribbean nations.

China and the Government of the Republic of Trinidad and Tobago were said to have formed an agreement where asphalt from Trinidad and Tobago would be exported to China during its construction boom in preparation for the 2008 Beijing Olympics. In exchange, China has led several construction projects in Trinidad and Tobago and the Caribbean region via Chinese owned construction companies. Trinidad and Tobago has also mooted the idea of starting direct shipments of oil and liquid natural gas direct from Trinidad and Tobago to China, to fuel the later's growing need for resources to fuel their economy.

As the Caribbean political heads of government have had several messy run-ins with the Bush administration in the United States with respect to recent demands, China has been more sympathetic to the Caribbean position globally and has stepped up military training exercises in the Caribbean for example in direct response to several sanctions placed on governments in the Caribbean region for not following the wishes of the Bush administration.

Several capital-works or infrastructural projects across the Caribbean region have also been financed or extended full grants by the Chinese government.

See also 

 Foreign relations of China
 Barbados–China relations
 China–Cuba relations
 Chinese Caribbeans
 Chinese Jamaicans
 Caribbean Chinese cuisine
 Internationalization of the renminbi
 List of the largest trading partners of China

References

Further reading

External links
 Ministry of Foreign Affairs for the People's Republic of China - Department of Latin American Affairs (Covering regions of Latin America and the Caribbean)

Foreign relations of China
Foreign relations of Taiwan
Foreign relations of the Caribbean